is a public university in Naha, Okinawa, Japan. The predecessor of the school was founded in 1946, and it was chartered as a university in 1999.

External links
 Official website 

Educational institutions established in 1946
Public universities in Japan
Universities and colleges in Okinawa Prefecture
Nursing schools in Japan
1946 establishments in Japan